Lussenga may be:
places in Angola:
Lussenga, Zaire 
Lussenga, Uíge,